The 2005 Speedway World Cup Race-off was the third race of the 2005 Speedway World Cup season. It took place on August 4, 2005 in the Olympic Stadium in Wrocław, Poland.

Results

Heat details

Heat after heat 
 Hampel, Bjerre, Suchanek, Watt
 Holta, Iversen, Shields, A.Dryml(e4)
 T.Gollob, Sullivan, H.Andersen, Topinka
 N.Pedersen, Adams, Protasiewicz, L.Dryml
 Walasek, Rymel, B.Pedersen, Johnston(X)
 Walasek, Sullivan, Bjerre, L.Dryml(e4)
 Iversen, Hampel, Adams, Rymel
 H.Andersen, Holta, Johnston, Suchanek
 T.Gollob, N.Pedersen, Watt, Rymel
 Protasiewicz, Shields, B.Pedersen, Topinka
 Adams, Holta, Bjerre, Topinka
 T.Gollob, L.Dryml, Johnston, Iversen
 Adams(joker), Protasiewicz, H.Andersen, Rymel
 Walasek, Shields, N.Pedersen, Suchanek
 Hampel, A.Dryml, B.Pedersen, Sullivan
 N.Pedersen, T.Gollob, Rymel, Shields
 Protasiewicz, Iversen, Sullivan, Suchanek
 Walasek, Adams, H.Andersen, A.Dryml
 N.Pedersen, Johnston, Hampel, Topinka
 H.Andersen(joker), Holta, L.Dryml, Sullivan
 Protasiewicz, A.Dryml, Bjerre, Johnston
 Walasek, Iversen, L.Dryml(joker), Watt
 H.Andersen, L.Dryml, Hampel, Shields
 Holta, N.Pedersen, Rymel, Sullivan
 T.Gollob, B.Pedersen, Adams, Suchanek(Fx)

References

See also 
 2005 Speedway World Cup
 motorcycle speedway

R